Hartwich is a German surname. Notable people with this surname include the following:

 Daniel Hartwich (born 1978), German television presenter and game show host
 Emil Hartwich (1843–1886), German judge, killed in a duel over an adulterous affair, which inspired Fontane's novel Effi Briest
 Herman Hartwich (1853–1926), German-American landscape and genre painter
 Iwona Hartwich (born 1970), Polish politician
 Johann Hartwich, Austrian table tennis player
 Oliver Marc Hartwich (born 1975), German economist and media commentator
 Wilhelm Karl Hartwich Peters (1815–1883), German naturalist and explorer

See also 
 
 Hartwig (surname)

German-language surnames